Mojmír Chytil (born 29 April 1999) is a Czech footballer who currently plays as a forward for Sigma Olomouc.

Early life
Chytil was born in Skalka, Prostějov District.

International career
Chytil has represented the Czech Republic at under-17 and under-20 level.

He received his first call up to the Czech Republic senior squad in November 2022, and went on to mark his debut with a hattrick in a 5–0 victory over the Faroe Islands.

Career statistics

Club

Notes

International

International goals
Scores and results list the Czech Republic's goal tally first, score column indicates score after each Czech Republic goal.

References

1999 births
Living people
People from Prostějov District
Czech footballers
Czech Republic youth international footballers
Czech Republic international footballers
Association football forwards
Moravian-Silesian Football League players
Czech First League players
1. SK Prostějov players
SK Sigma Olomouc players
FK Pardubice players